Srnka is a surname. Notable people with the surname include:

Jiří Srnka (1907–1982), Czech composer
Miroslav Srnka (born 1975), Czech composer

Czech-language surnames